

385001–385100 

|-bgcolor=#f2f2f2
| colspan=4 align=center | 
|}

385101–385200 

|-bgcolor=#f2f2f2
| colspan=4 align=center | 
|}

385201–385300 

|-id=205
| 385205 Michelvancamp ||  || Michel Van Camp (born 1969), Belgian physicist and head of the Seismology-Gravimetry service at the Royal Observatory of Belgium in Brussels. His research includes gravimetry, intraplate deformations and hydrological effects on gravity (Src). || 
|}

385301–385400 

|-bgcolor=#f2f2f2
| colspan=4 align=center | 
|}

385401–385500 

|-id=446
| 385446 Manwë ||  || Manwë is foremost among the deities who rule the world in the mythology created by Tolkien. || 
|}

385501–385600 

|-id=571
| 385571 Otrera ||  || Otrera, the first queen of the Amazons. She was involved with Ares and was the mother of the Amazons queen Penthesilea, who led the Amazons in the Trojan war. || 
|}

385601–385700 

|-id=695
| 385695 Clete ||  || Clete was an Amazon and the attendant to the Amazons queen Penthesilea, who led the Amazons in the Trojan war. Clete went looking for Penthesilea after she went missing after the Trojan War. || 
|}

385701–385800 

|-bgcolor=#f2f2f2
| colspan=4 align=center | 
|}

385801–385900 

|-bgcolor=#f2f2f2
| colspan=4 align=center | 
|}

385901–386000 

|-id=980
| 385980 Emiliosegrè ||  || Emilio Segrè (1905–1989) was an Italian-American physicist and 1959 Nobel Prize laureate for discovery of the antiproton. He also discovered the elements technetium and astatine. || 
|}

References 

385001-386000